Bandits From Shantung (Chinese: 山東響馬) is a 1972 Hong Kong wuxia film directed by Huang Feng.

Cast
Chang Yi as Teh Yee
Hu Chin as Shao Lian Hua
Pai Ying as Bandit chief
Sammo Hung as Bell thrower
Chin Yuet-sang
Tien Mi as Ling-ling
Yee Yuen as X on forehead
Chow Kong
Wilson Tong
Cham Siu-hung
Jang Jeong-kuk
Choe Sung-kwan
Kim Ki-bum
Law Keung

External links

Bandits from Shantung on Hong Kong Cinemagic

1972 films
Hong Kong martial arts films
Golden Harvest films
Wuxia films
1970s action films
1970s Mandarin-language films
1970s Hong Kong films